Jonathan Tremblay (born November 15, 1984) is a Canadian politician, who was elected to the House of Commons of Canada in the 2011 election. He represented the electoral district of Montmorency—Charlevoix—Haute-Côte-Nord as a member of the New Democratic Party. Tremblay was defeated when he ran for re-election in 2015.

Shortly after his defeat, Tremblay announced he would seek a city council seat in Beaupré in a by-election.

Prior to being elected, Tremblay was a bricklayer and mason. He has two children.

References

External links

Members of the House of Commons of Canada from Quebec
New Democratic Party MPs
Living people
1984 births
21st-century Canadian politicians